Maarif in Semitic languages relates to the basal root ARF (West, Plan, Goal, Fortune, Knowledge) 

it also may refer to one of these places:

Maârif, neighborhood of Casablanca, Morocco
Maarif, Algeria
Maarif, Azerbaijan